The Lancashire and Yorkshire Railway Class 32 was a small class of 0-8-2T steam locomotives, intended for heavy shunting and banking duties.

Overview
From 1903 with the introduction of Henry Ivatt's Class L1, several of the UK railway companies introduced extremely large tank engines that were eight- or even ten-coupled, with few carrying axles, so as to achieve the maximum adhesive weight over their driving wheels. Although limited in their maximum speed by the lack of any pilot truck, their size was the maximum permitted by the loading gauge and their axle loading specifications, and so they could achieve a high tractive effort. On some lines this was put to use for accelerating suburban passenger services, in competition with the new electric railways. Other railways required heavy shunters, to cope with the increasing weight of freight trains. These were particularly needed for the new technology of hump shunting. Although the tank engine layout restricted the coal and water capacity that could be provided (their large boilers left little space for side tanks), all of these uses were relatively short ranged, and so the engines did not require long endurance.

Hughes' locomotives
In 1908, Hughes produced a locomotive of this type for the Lancashire and Yorkshire. These tank engines were based on the previous Aspinall Class 30 0-8-0 tender engines, although their similarities have often been over-emphasised. This was more successful than similar flangeless drivers had been with Hoy's Class 26 2-6-2Ts, where they had shown a tendency for the centre drivers to drop between the rails if track in a siding wasn't maintained as well as main-line track.

Boiler design 
The type 'L' boiler was again substantially different to any other class. It was 5 feet 9.5 inches in diameter (6 ft 1 in over the outer wrapper), a foot larger than the 'J' boiler of the previous engines. A Belpaire firebox and Ramsbottom safety valves were used. A similar boiler was fitted to Hughes' 1910 large-boilered Class 9, a development of the Class 30. Although this was another feature often described as being in common with the 0-8-0s, they were actually longer than the L boiler. The L boiler was unique to the Class 32, although they were made on the same flanging plates as Hughes' Dreadnought class. This unique boiler would eventually lead to the class' early withdrawal, when the boilers were due for replacement at twenty years old.

Superheating was an innovation at this time and not yet firmly established, mostly owing to difficulties in providing adequate cylinder lubrication. Hughes was an advocate of superheating and used it when rebuilding the 7 ft 3 in Class 4 express 4-4-0s, fitting Schmidt superheaters and piston valves, along with Walschaerts valve gear. Despite this, he recognised that an intermittently worked shunting engine such as the 0-8-2Ts would not allow the superheater elements to reach their optimum working temperature, and so retained a simpler saturated boiler.

Other detail fittings included vacuum brakes and oval buffers, to avoid locking of buffer heads when working around tight curves with the engine's long overhang at each end.

Service

Lancashire & Yorkshire
All five engines were ordered from Horwich Works in one batch as Lot 59 on 28 November 1907. They were delivered between March and April 1908. They carried the full 'passenger' livery of the L&YR, in black with single red and double white lining.

The original intention had been to employ these engines in the hump shunting yards at Aintree. However, problems with the spring hangers fouling the electric third rail system on the lines from Liverpool to Ormskirk between the engine shed and the sidings led to their withdrawal from this service.

Nos. 1501 and 1502 were then allocated to Accrington for working the 1 in 38 Baxenden bank.

1505 was first allocated to Agecroft for the Manchester Ship Canal sidings at New Barnes junction. Nos. 1503 and 1504 were later allocated here, upon which 1505 joined the other engines at Accrington, as a spare. 

The class were nicknamed either  'Egberts'  or  'Little Egberts'''. This has been described as being after a troupe of circus elephants, although there is no obvious record of such a troupe. Another explanation could be The Egbert Brothers'', a music hall double act of this time, known for their routine 'The Happy Dustmen'.

LMS 
Despite the urgency for their building, there appears to have been little need for the class in service, especially in their later years. Soon after the Grouping in 1923, LMS policy for weeding out non-standard types made the class superfluous. Their boiler's eventual need for replacement, and their unique design, led to the whole class' withdrawal between 1927 and 1929. All were allocated LMS numbers, but only 1504 was repainted in LMS black livery with its new number of 11803 painted on and losing its original cast numberplate.

References 

0-8-2T locomotives
32
Railway locomotives introduced in 1908
Standard gauge steam locomotives of Great Britain
D1′ n2t locomotives